Reina H. Maruyama is a Japanese–American experimental particle/atomic/nuclear physicist. As a professor at Yale University, Maruyama was elected a Fellow of the American Physical Society for her "innovative and wide-ranging contributions to the experimental study of rare events and fundamental symmetries, especially the search for neutrinoless double beta decay, and for leadership in understanding the signature and nature of dark matter."

Early life and education
Maruyama was born to parents Yoshiko and Toru Maruyama in Japan. Her family moved to New Canaan, Connecticut when she was 12 years old. She graduated with a Bachelor of Science degree in Applied Physics from Columbia University in 1995 and her PhD in atomic physics at the University of Washington in 2003. Reina then joined Stuart Freedman's group at the University of California, Berkeley / Lawrence Berkeley National Laboratory as a Chancellor's Postdoctoral Fellow.

Career
Following her PhD and fellowships, Maruyama joined the faculty at the University of Wisconsin–Madison (UW) in 2011. During her tenure at UW, she was involved in the construction and commissioning of the IceCube detector, a gigaton particle detector to observe the by-products of neutrinos that interact with the Antarctic ice. Reina eventually left UW to become an assistant professor of Physics at Yale University in July 2013. Prior to leaving, she was named the Woman Physicist of the Month by the American Physical Society (APS) as someone who has "positively impacted the lives and careers of others." As a professor at Yale, Maruyama was awarded a continuing grant from the National Science Foundation for her research program "Testing DAMA with the COSINE Experiment."

In September 2020, Maruyama was elected a Fellow of the APS for her "innovative and wide-ranging contributions to the experimental study of rare events and fundamental symmetries, especially the search for neutrinoless double beta decay, and for leadership in understanding the signature and nature of dark matter." She was also elected a fellow of the Connecticut Academy of Science in 2021. During the same year, Maruyama was selected to serve on a committee to develop the Diversity, Equity, Inclusion, and Belonging plan for Yale's Faculty of Arts and Sciences.

Personal life
Maruyama married astrophysicist Karsten Heeger in 2004.

References

External links

Living people
American academics of Japanese descent
American women physicists
American nuclear physicists
Yale University faculty
University of Wisconsin–Madison faculty
Columbia School of Engineering and Applied Science alumni
University of Washington alumni
Fellows of the American Physical Society
Year of birth missing (living people)
21st-century American women
Japanese emigrants to the United States